Bay View is a census-designated place (CDP) in Skagit County, Washington, United States. The population was 696 at the 2010 census. It is included in the Mount Vernon–Anacortes, Washington Metropolitan Statistical Area.

History
Bay View was named and plotted in 1884 by William J. McKenna.

Geography
Bay View is located at  (48.482846, -122.47551).

According to the United States Census Bureau, the CDP has a total area of 1.6 square miles (4.3 km2), all of it land.

Demographics
As of the census of 2000, there were 334 people, 161 households, and 95 families residing in the CDP. The population density was 203.0 people per square mile (78.2/km2). There were 168 housing units at an average density of 102.1/sq mi (39.3/km2). The racial makeup of the CDP was 96.41% White, 0.90% Native American, 0.30% Asian, 0.30% from other races, and 2.10% from two or more races. Hispanic or Latino of any race were 2.40% of the population.

There were 161 households, out of which 18.6% had children under the age of 18 living with them, 54.7% were married couples living together, 3.1% had a female householder with no husband present, and 40.4% were non-families. 34.2% of all households were made up of individuals, and 11.8% had someone living alone who was 65 years of age or older. The average household size was 2.07 and the average family size was 2.65.

In the CDP, the age distribution of the population shows 17.4% under the age of 18, 4.2% from 18 to 24, 19.8% from 25 to 44, 36.8% from 45 to 64, and 21.9% who were 65 years of age or older. The median age was 48 years. For every 100 females, there were 83.5 males. For every 100 females age 18 and over, there were 80.4 males.

The median income for a household in the CDP was $27,250, and the median income for a family was $28,214. Males had a median income of $31,917 versus $0 for females. The per capita income for the CDP was $14,782. None of the families and 5.2% of the population were living below the poverty line, including no under eighteens and 8.1% of those over 64.

References

Census-designated places in Skagit County, Washington
Census-designated places in Washington (state)